is a former Japanese football player.

Playing career
Nara was born in Yokosuka on December 12, 1982. After graduating from high school, he joined J1 League club Consadole Sapporo in 2001. On March 9, 2002, he debuted as substitute from the 78th minute against Vegalta Sendai. However he could only play this match until 2002. In 2003, he moved to Regional Leagues club Thespa Kusatsu. In 2004, he moved to Japan Football League club Gunma FC Horikoshi (later FC Horikoshi). He played many matches as regular player. In September 2005, he moved to Regional Leagues club Rosso Kumamoto. In 2006, he moved to Regional Leagues club Matsumoto Yamaga FC. However he could not play many matches. In May 2007, he moved to Regional Leagues club Zweigen Kanazawa. He played many matches and scored many goals in 2 season. He retired end of 2008 season.

Club statistics

References

External links

1982 births
Living people
Association football people from Kanagawa Prefecture
Japanese footballers
J1 League players
Japan Football League players
Hokkaido Consadole Sapporo players
Thespakusatsu Gunma players
Arte Takasaki players
Roasso Kumamoto players
Matsumoto Yamaga FC players
Zweigen Kanazawa players
Association football midfielders